The Rensselaer Engineers represented Rensselaer Polytechnic Institute in ECAC women's ice hockey during the 2017–18 NCAA Division I women's ice hockey season.

Offseason

Recruiting

2017–18 Engineers

Schedule

|-
!colspan=12 style="background:#F7001F;color:white;"| Regular Season

References

Rensselaer
RPI Engineers women's ice hockey seasons
RPI 
RPI